NGC 234 is a spiral galaxy located in the constellation Pisces. It was discovered on October 14, 1784 by William Herschel.

References

External links
 

0234
Intermediate spiral galaxies
Pisces (constellation)
002600